The International Symposium on the Analytic Hierarchy Process (ISAHP) is a biennial conference on multi-criteria decision analysis, particularly the analytic hierarchy process (AHP) and its extension the analytic network process (ANP), both developed by Thomas L. Saaty, and the combination of these with other methods. It brings together researchers, teachers and users of AHP and ANP to share their research and practical experience in making decisions incorporating these two processes.

Papers presented at ISAHP cover the major results of international research in the AHP and ANP, and provide solutions for current challenges in important areas of decision making.

The 14th ISAHP will take place in London, UK, August, 2016.

References

Mathematics conferences